The Ambassador of the United Kingdom to Qatar is the United Kingdom's foremost diplomatic representative in the State of Qatar, and head of the UK's diplomatic mission in Doha.

Heads of Mission
Ambassador Extraordinary and Plenipotentiary
1971–1973: Edward Henderson
1973–1974: Douglas Gordon
1974–1978: David Crawford
1978–1981: Colin Brant
1981–1984: Stephen Day
1984–1987: Julian Walker
1987–1990: Patrick Nixon
1990–1993: Sir Graham Boyce
1993–1997: Patrick Wogan
1997–2002: David Wright
2002–2005: David MacLennan
2005–2007: Simon Collis

Chargé d'affaires
2007–2008: Roderick Drummond

Ambassador
2008–2012: John Hawkins
2012–2013: Michael O'Neill
2013–2015: Nicholas Hopton

2015–: Ajay Sharma

References

External links
UK and Qatar, gov.uk

 
Qatar
United Kingdom Ambassadors